The Kispiox Band Council are a First Nation based near the meeting of the Skeena and Bulkley Rivers in northwestern B.C.  They are members of the Gitxsan Treaty Society.

Chief and Councillors
The following Band Council members were elected to serve a two-year term from July 2021 to July 2023:
Chief Councillor:  Cameron Stevens
Councillors:  Stuart Barnes, Jordan Muldoe, Gwen Simms, Kevin Stevens, Lance Stevens, Victor Stevens, Denzel Sutherland-Wilson, Kolin Sutherland-Wilson, Cheryl Williams.

Treaty Process

History

Demographics
The Kispiox Nation has 1,495 members.

Economic Development

Social, Educational and Cultural Programs and Facilities

References

Skeena Country
Gitxsan governments